The Poggiolo is a small coastal stream in the department of Haute-Corse, Corsica, France.
It enters the Tyrrhenian Sea from the east of the Cap Corse peninsula.

Course

The stream rises in the Serra di Guagalone.
Its source is to the east of the  U Cimone.
It flows south and then east past the village of Santa-Maria-di-Lota to enter the sea in the village of Miomo.
Its mouth is south of the Miomo pebble beach.

For thirteen centuries the coasts of Corsica were at risk of being raided.
The Genoese built a tower, the Torra di Miomu, near the mouth of the Poggiolu to guard its valley.

Environment

The stream flows through a hilly schist landscape covered in thick maquis shrubland, with groves of green oaks (Quercus ilex).
Along its banks there are ash trees, alders, hornbeams, hops and chestnut trees.
The stream is populated with brown trout (Salmo trutta).
The stream is in the Chenaies vertes du Cap Corse (Cap Corse green oaks) Zone naturelle d'intérêt écologique, faunistique et floristique (ZNIEFF).

Tributaries

The following streams (ruisseaux) are tributaries of the Poggiolo:
 Mandriale: 
 Cavalligna:

Notes

Sources

Rivers of Haute-Corse
Rivers of France
Coastal basins of the Tyrrhenian Sea in Corsica